Bo Westergren (born 23 May 1950) is a Swedish former butterfly and freestyle swimmer. He competed in three events at the 1968 Summer Olympics.

References

External links
 

1950 births
Living people
Swedish male butterfly swimmers
Swedish male freestyle swimmers
Olympic swimmers of Sweden
Swimmers at the 1968 Summer Olympics
Swimmers from Stockholm